UKNC is a Soviet PDP-11-compatible educational micro computer, aimed at teaching school informatics courses. It is also known as Elektronika MS-0511. UKNC stands for Educational Computer by Scientific Centre.

Hardware
CPU: KM1801VM2 @ 8 MHz, 16 bit data bus, 17 bit address bus
Peripheral processor: KM1801VM2 @ 6.25 MHz
CPU RAM: 64 KiB
PPU RAM: 32 KiB
ROM: 32 KiB
video RAM: 96 KiB (3 planes 32 KiB each, each 3-bit pixel had a bit in each plane)
Graphics: max 640×288 with 8 colors in one line (16 or 53 colors on whole screen), it is possible to set an individual palette, resolution (80, 160, 320, or 640 dots per line) and memory address for each of 288 screen lines; no text mode.
Keyboard: 88 keys (MS-7007), JCUKEN layout
built-in LAN controller
built-in controller for common or special tape-recorder with computer control (to use for data storage, usually 5-inch FDD's were used)

One unique part of the design is the usage of a peripheral processing unit (PPU). Management of peripheral devices (display, audio, and so on) was offloaded to the PPU, which can also run user programs.

The computer was released in 3 sub-models: 0511, 0511.1, 0511.2. The 0511.1 model, intended for home use, has a power supply for 220 V AC, while others use 42 V AC. The 0511.2 features new firmware with extended functionality and changed the marking of the keyboard's gray keys, compared to the initial version. The photo shows an 0511.2 variant.

There is no active cooling, and at least the 0511.2 variant tends to overheat and halt after several hours of operation.

The design of the case, the layout of the keyboard, the location and the shape of expansion slots are inspired by the Yamaha MSX system, which was purchased by the Soviet Union in the early 1980s for use in schools. The same case, with changed markings, is found with the IBM PC clone called Elektronika MS-1502. The same case and keyboard are found on another educational computer called Rusich (i8085 based).

Software

Operating system: RAFOS, FODOS (RT-11 clones), or RT-11SJ/FB
LAN control program
Programming languages:
BASIC (Vilnius BASIC)
Fortran
Pascal
Modula-2
C
Assembler
Rapira
E-practicum
Logo
Prolog
Forth
FOCAL

See also
DVK
Elektronika BK-0010
SM EVM

External links

UKNC emulator project; contains RT-11 images
Archive software and documentation for Soviet computers UK-NC, DVK, and BK0010.

Microcomputers
Ministry of the Electronics Industry (Soviet Union) computers
PDP-11